Shkodran Maholli (born 10 April 1993) is a Swedish professional footballer of Kosovar Albanian descent who plays as a striker for Brage.

Career
Starting his career in Hyltebruks IF, Maholli moved to Halmstads BK youth squad in 2006 at the age of 13. He suffered from a long range of injuries which prevented him from taking part of entire seasons. During the 2011 pre-season he made his debut first for the U21 team and then the senior team nine days later in the friendly derby against IS Halmia. He then participated in the friendly against Kalmar FF, before making his first competitive match as he made the starting lineup against Kalmar FF in Allsvenskan just a week later.

After representing Halmstad in two league matches, Maholli suffered an injury during the summer which kept him away from the senior team for the rest of the season, prior to the 2012 season he was moved down from the senior team to the U19 squad.

In July 2018, Maholli moved abroad for the first time in his career, signing with Silkeborg IF in the Danish 1st Division.

In August 2020 he was signed by Helsingborgs IF at a 1/2 year contract.

Personal life
Shkodrans parents moved to Sweden in 1986. His father Shygeri played football for Rydöbruk IF in Division 5, while his two brothers, Shqipron and Kushtrim, played for Torup/Rydö FF and IS Halmia respectively.

Career statistics

References

External links
 
 

Living people
1993 births
People from Hylte Municipality
Association football forwards
Swedish footballers
Swedish expatriate footballers
Swedish people of Kosovan descent
Swedish people of Albanian descent
Sweden youth international footballers
Allsvenskan players
Superettan players
Danish 1st Division players
Halmstads BK players
Åtvidabergs FF players
BK Häcken players
IK Sirius Fotboll players
Silkeborg IF players
Super United Sports players
Helsingborgs IF players
IK Brage players
Expatriate men's footballers in Denmark
Swedish expatriate sportspeople in Denmark
Expatriate footballers in the Maldives
Swedish expatriate sportspeople in the Maldives
Sportspeople from Halland County